Kailash Vijayvargiya (born 13 May 1956) is an Indian politician serving as National General Secretary of Bharatiya Janata Party . He started his political career in the Indore Bharatiya Janata Party, and was the mayor of Indore, a six-time legislator who has never lost an assembly election, and a state government cabinet minister for over 12 years before being elevated to the party's central leadership.

Vijavargiya was made in charge of BJP's election campaign for Haryana in 2014, after which BJP gained a majority in the assembly election. This victory allowed him to gain a more central role in party leadership, and in June 2015 he was appointed national general secretary by party president Amit Shah, and the new leader of the BJP in West Bengal.

Personal life
Vijavargiya was born on 13 May 1956 to Shankardayal Vijavargiya in Indore. He graduated with a Bachelor of Science degree and later earned an LLB. Vijavargiya is married to Asha Vijayvargiya, with whom he has two sons, including politician Akash Vijayvargiya.

Political career 
Vijayvargiya entered politics through Akhil Bharatiya Vidyarthi Parishad (ABVP) in 1975. He became a corporator of the Indore Municipal Corporation in 1983 and a member of the standing committee in 1985. He has been the state secretary of the Bharatiya Janata Yuva Morcha (BJYM), the BJP, and Indore, and the co-ordinator of State BJP legal cell. He became the state co-ordinator of Vidyarthi Parishad in 1985, state vice-president of the BJYM in 1992, and the national general secretary of the BJYM and the leader of Gujarat in 1993. Vijayvargiya was elected to the Vidhan Sabha in 1990, 1993, 1998, 2003, 2008, and 2013.

He was in charge of the BJP's Haryana state assembly election campaign in 2014, when the party registered its first win in the Haryana state assembly election, taking BJP's tally from 4 to 47 seats. He was named the National General Secretary of the Bharatiya Janata Party as well as the party leader for West Bengal in 2015.
He was included in the top 100 influential person list of India for year 2021. 
He was considered as a game changer for BJP in West Bengal as party won 18 seat in 2019 Lok sabha election.

Mayor 
Vijayvargiya became the first directly elected mayor of Indore Municipal Corporation in 2000. He was nominated president of the South Asia Mayors’ Council in 2003, and led the Indian Voluntary Organisation’s team at the World Earth Summit in Durban.

State cabinet minister 
Vijayvargiya was sworn in as cabinet minister in Madhya Pradesh Government on 8 December 2008, and given portfolios of Public Works, Parliamentary Affairs, Urban Administration and Development. He was given a portfolio of Religious Trusts, Endowment, and Rehabilitation on 1 July 2004. Vijayvargiya again joined Babulal Gaur's Council of Ministers as Public Works Minister on 27 August 2004. He was re-inducted into Shivraj Singh Chouhan's Council of Ministers on 4 December 2005, as a Public Works, Information Technology, and Science & Technology Minister.

In the second cabinet under Shivraj Singh Chouhan (post-2008 elections), Vijayvargiya held portfolios of IT and Industries. In the third cabinet (post-2013 elections), Vijayvargiya held the portfolio of Urban Development.

When talking to reporters about the Vyapam Scam which involved former BJP leader Laxmikant Sharma, Vijayvargiya said, "For us it (Vyapam) is a chutput (small) scam. It may be big for you." When asked about journalist Akshay Singh, who was mysteriously murdered while investigating the scandal, Vijayvargiya said, "Forget that journalist who died. Is he more important than I am?"

In 2013, In Indore, talking to the journalists about the rapes in India, Vijayvargiya said women must keep themselves within the limits of 'maryada' else face the consequences.

BJP National General Secretary
In 2015, when Shah Rukh Khan commented that India had been undergoing a period of increased intolerance, Vijayvargiya tweeted to his followers that "Shah Rukh Khan lives in India, but his heart is in Pakistan. His films make crores here but he finds India intolerant," as well as "When many died in Bombay in 1993, where was Shah Rukh Khan? When 26/11 attacks took place in Mumbai, where was Shah Rukh?"

In 2016, on the heels of surgical strikes by the Indian Army in Pakistan-administered Kashmir, Vijayvargiya stated that asking for proof of the strikes or in any way questioning the Indian Armed Forces would amount to an act of sedition.

In 2019, he was again embroiled in controversy for defending his son, Akash Vijayvargiya, who beat a government official with a bat. The government official had come to inspect and demolish an old building in Indore.

On 5 January 2020, Vijayvargiya was charged by MP Police on charges of threatening government officials during an RSS event in Indore. On 20 January, he drew criticism with his remark stating that labourers who recently carried out construction work at his house could be Bangladeshis. He found eating habits of some of the workers 'strange' as they were eating only Poha, a common food item in the subcontinent.

On 19 June 2022, Kailash Vijayvargiya discussing about the Agnipath Scheme for recruitment in the military, said that the Agniveers can get jobs of security guard at BJP offices. The video of the remark went viral, and several opposition parties condemned his statement, Arvind Kejriwal responded that the "country's youth work hard day and night to pass the physical test and exam because they want to serve the country for their whole life by joining the military and not because they want to join as guards for the BJP office."

See also 
 List of people from Madhya Pradesh
 :Category:Bharatiya Janata Party politicians

References

External links 
 

1956 births
Living people
Mayors of places in Madhya Pradesh
Politicians from Indore
State cabinet ministers of Madhya Pradesh
Madhya Pradesh MLAs 1993–1998
Madhya Pradesh MLAs 1998–2003
Madhya Pradesh MLAs 2003–2008
Madhya Pradesh MLAs 2008–2013
Madhya Pradesh MLAs 2013–2018
Bharatiya Janata Party politicians from Madhya Pradesh